Juhan Viiding (1 June 1948 –  21 February 1995), also known under the pseudonym of Jüri Üdi was an Estonian poet and actor.

Personal life
Juhan Viiding was born on 1 June 1948 in Tallinn to Paul Viiding, a well-known poet in Estonia who had belonged to the influential Arbujad (Soothsayers) – a collective group of eight young influential poets who rose to prominence before the outbreak of World War II – and Linda Viiding (née Laarmann), a noted translator. Juhan was the youngest of four children and the only boy—his older sisters were Reet, Anni and radio journalist Mari Tarand. He was an intellectually precocious and restless youngster. Between the years 1968 and 1972, Viiding studied theatre and stagecraft at the Tallinn Conservatory (now the Estonian Academy of Music and Theatre), under instruction of actor and theatre pedagogue Voldemar Panso, graduating in 1972. Among his graduating classmates were Kersti Kreismann, Ivo Eensalu, Vello Janson, Rein Kotkas, Helle Meri (née Pihlak), Katrin Kumpan, Martin Veinmann, and Tõnis Rätsep.

Juhan Viiding was married to Riina Kiisk, the daughter of actor, film director and politician Kaljo Kiisk. Their daughter Elo is also a poet.

On 21 February 1995 Juhan Viiding committed suicide in Rapla by cutting his wrists.

Dramatic career
Upon his graduation in 1972, Viiding worked in Tallinn's National Drama Theatre (now the Estonian Drama Theatre).

During the last ten years of his life Viiding staged many plays. His favourite playwrights were Samuel Beckett, Eugène Ionesco, and Minoru Betsuyaku.

Viiding worked at the Estonian Drama Theatre until his death on 21 February 1995.

Literary career
Juhan Viiding who until 1975 published his poetry under the pseudonym Jüri Üdi was the brightest talent to appear in Estonian poetry in the 1970s. Unlike the major poets of the immediately preceding generation (Rummo, Kaplinski, Runnel), he never wrote essays or criticism.

The heteronymic poetics of the modern Portuguese classic Fernando Pessoa (whose selected poetry was translated into Estonian in 1973), may have served as an impulse for Juhan Viiding to create the poet Jüri Üdi. However, the difference between the works published under the author's name and his pseudonym is that the "marrow" of Juhan Viiding's poetry remained in his George Marrow pseudonym; what followed, under his authentic name, lacked the former brilliance. Jüri Üdi's playfulness and rich undertones gave way to a more direct and pathetic expression. It is not known whether Viiding intended to develop a second poetic voice in addition to that of Jüri Üdi, or that he simply realized that the Soviet era of ideological symbols—as described in his "Jüri’s Yarn"—was coming to an end and the actor Jüri Üdi could drop the mask to reveal Juhan Viiding's true literary face.

In October 1980, Viiding was a signatory of the Letter of 40 Intellectuals, a public letter in which forty prominent Estonian intellectuals defended the Estonian language and protested the Russification policies of the Kremlin in Estonia.  The signatories also expressed their unease against Republic-level government in harshly dealing with youth protests in Tallinn that were sparked a week earlier due to the banning of a public performance of the punk rock band Propeller.

Selected works
Närvitrükk (Nerve Print, 1971)
Aastalaat (Year's Fair, 1971)
Detsember (December, 1971)
Käekäik (1973)
Selges eesti keeles (In Plain Estonian, 1974) Note: As a footnote of the title Viiding requested that the name of the language in the title has to be renamed to the one that was used for translating. Therefore, the translation of the title should be "In Plain English"
Armastuskirjad (Love Letters, 1975)
Ma olin Jüri Üdi (I Was George Marrow, 1978)
Olevused (Beings, 1979) Note: Co-written with Tõnis Rätsep
Elulootus (Hope of Life/Being without a Biography, 1980) Note: Due to the clever word-play in the title as it is in the original Estonian, both of the "translations" presented here are correct. In an interview, Viiding admitted that the wordplay in the title was intentional.
Tänan ja Palun (Cheers and Please, 1983)
Osa (Part, 1991)

References

External links

Examples of Juhan Viiding's Poetry (English translations) (archived version)

1948 births
1995 suicides
Estonian male poets
Estonian male stage actors
Estonian male film actors
Male actors from Tallinn
Writers from Tallinn
Suicides by sharp instrument in Estonia
20th-century Estonian poets
20th-century Estonian male actors
Burials at Metsakalmistu
Estonian Academy of Music and Theatre alumni
20th-century male writers